The Fairy Caravan is a children's book written and illustrated by Beatrix Potter and first published in 1929 by Alexander McKay in Philadelphia. As noted by Leslie Linder, "Potter did not wish for an English edition of The Fairy Caravan, because she felt the stories were 'too personal - too autobiographical' to publish in this country". In order to secure English copyright, however, Potter produced 100 copies with the first eighteen pages discarded and replaced by sheets privately printed in Ambleside by George Middleton.

Plot
The story follows the adventures of Tuppenny, a young guinea pig who runs away from home to join a travelling circus.

Background
The woods and estate surrounding Graythwaite Hall in the Lake District, Cumbria, are the backdrop for Potter's story. They were a favourite walking spot for Wordsworth.

Reception
The book is described by Margaret Drabble as:  '...those later written ... for the US....' ;  and also:   '...of little interest' .

References

External links

 
 "Peter Says Please" by Barbara Bader, from the Horn Book, 1999 – American connection with The Fairy Caravan

1929 children's books
 British children's books
Books by Beatrix Potter
The Fairy Caravan
Picture books by Beatrix Potter